Duroc is a station on Line 10 and Line 13 of the Paris Métro. It is located at the point for which the 6th, 7th and 15th arrondissements share a common border. In 2013, it was the network's 158th busiest station out of 302, with 3,339,347 users.

History

The Line 10 station was opened on 30 December 1923 as part of the first section of the ligne circulaire intérieure (inner circular line) from Invalides to Croix-Rouge (a station east of Sèvres–Babylone, which was closed during World War II). This line was planned by Fulgence Bienvenüe to connect the city's six main railway stations, with Duroc presumably intended to serve the Gare Montparnasse, although it is 500 metres away.

This project was eventually abandoned and on 27 July 1937, the section from Duroc to Invalides was transferred to become the first section of old Line 14, which was connected under the Seine and incorporated into Line 13 on 9 November 1976. The section between Duroc and Croix-Rouge, by that time extended east to Jussieu remained as Line 10, which was on the same day (27 July 1937) was extended west from Duroc to La Motte-Picquet–Grenelle.

The station is named after Géraud Duroc, Duke of Frioul (1772–1813), who was one of Napoleon's generals. It is located close to the location of an old toll gate on the road to Sèvres, part of the Wall of the Ferme générale, which was built around Paris between 1784 and 1791 by the ferme générale company of tax farmers.

Station layout

Gallery

References

 Roland, Gérard (2003). Stations de métro. D’Abbesses à Wagram. Éditions Bonneton.

Paris Métro stations in the 7th arrondissement of Paris
Paris Métro stations in the 6th arrondissement of Paris
Paris Métro stations in the 15th arrondissement of Paris
Railway stations in France opened in 1923